Ponnu Mapillai is a 1969 Indian Tamil-language film directed by S. Ramanathan. The film stars Jaishankar and Kanchana.

Plot

Cast 
 Jaishankar as Ramesh
 Kanchana as Bhuvana Ramesh
 Nagesh as Sedhu
P. S. Veerappa as Dharma prakash
A. Veerappan as Madhu
 V. K. Ramasamy as Ekambaram
 Manorama as Saraswathi [Guest Appearance]
 C. L. Anandan as Dharma prakash's henchman
 A. Karunanidhi as Thazhamuthu
Pakoda Kadhar as Krishna
 B. V. Radha as Mad girl
 Renuka as Owner's daughter
Typist Gopu as Thazhamuthu's sidekick
Usilai Mani as Train passenger
Baby Rani
Tambaram Lalitha as Kannamma
Kambar Jayaraman as Neighbor
 S. Rama Rao as Thangamuthu
 K. Vijayan as Inspector
 Angamuthu as Hamsavalli

Soundtrack 
Music composed by Vedha. Lyrics were written by Kannadasan & Thanjai Vanan.
Playback singers are T. M. Soundararajan, A. L. Raghavan, P. Susheela & L. R. Eswari.

Reception 
The Indian Express wrote, "The script is very intelligent and that is the first thing. The credit goes to Usili Somanathan. [..] the credit goes to the director S. Ramanathan who handles the script sensitively and intelligently".

References

External links 
 

1969 films
1960s Tamil-language films
Films directed by S. Ramanathan
Films scored by Vedha (composer)